The 1964 Roller Hockey World Cup was the sixteenth roller hockey world cup, organized by the Fédération Internationale de Patinage a Roulettes (now under the name of Fédération Internationale de Roller Sports). It was contested by 10 national teams (7 from Europe, 2 from South America and 1 from Asia, for the first time ever). All the games were played in the city of Barcelona, in Spain, the chosen city to host the World Cup.

Results

Standings

See also
 FIRS Roller Hockey World Cup

External links
 1964 World Cup in rink-hockey.net historical database

Roller Hockey World Cup
International roller hockey competitions hosted by Spain
1964 in Spanish sport
1964 in roller hockey